Idana is an unincorporated community in Clay County, Kansas, United States.  As of the 2020 census, the population of the community and nearby areas was 54.  It is located approximately 6.5 miles west of Clay Center, and 1.5 miles south of US Route 24 along 16th Rd.

History
Idana is combination of the names of two settlers: Ida Howland and Anna Broughton.

A post office was opened in Chapmanville (an extinct town) in 1879, but it was moved to Idana in 1882 and remained in operation until it was discontinued in 1980.

Idana was located on the Union Pacific Railroad.

Demographics

For statistical purposes, the United States Census Bureau has defined this community as a census-designated place (CDP).

Education
The community is served by Clay County USD 379 public school district.

References

Further reading

External links
 Clay County maps: Current, Historic, KDOT

Unincorporated communities in Clay County, Kansas
Unincorporated communities in Kansas